Zeynep Seda Uslu (born October 30, 1983) is a Turkish volleyball player. She is 180 cm and plays as setter. She plays for Turkish professional club Fenerbahçe Universal.

She started her volleyball career with VakıfBank Güneş Sigorta (1999-05) and also played for Eczacıbaşı Zenitiva (2006–09), Beşiktaş (2009–10) and Galatasaray Medical Park (2005–06 and 2010–11) before transferred to Fenerbahçe Universal.

 Turkish League: 2004, 2005, 2007, 2008
 Turkish Cup: 2009
 Top Teams Cup: 2004

See also
 Turkish women in sports

References

1983 births
Living people
Turkish women's volleyball players
VakıfBank S.K. volleyballers
Eczacıbaşı volleyball players
Beşiktaş volleyballers
Galatasaray S.K. (women's volleyball) players
Fenerbahçe volleyballers
20th-century Turkish sportswomen
21st-century Turkish sportswomen